Lousie Wood Law is a hill in the Lowther Hills range, part of the Southern Uplands of Scotland. The terminal northeast Donald on the main ridge in the northern portion of the Lowthers range, it is most easily climbed from its northern and eastern flanks.

References

Mountains and hills of the Southern Uplands
Donald mountains